John Jamieson Willis  (8 November 1872 – 12 November 1954) was an Anglican bishop, Bishop of Uganda from 1912 to 1934 and subsequently Assistant Bishop of Leicester. He and William George Peel, Bishop of Mombasa, were accused of heresy during the Kikuyu controversy.

Biography
Born on 8 November 1872, the second son of Sir William Willis, Accountant-General of the Navy, and great-grandson of Joseph Tucker, Surveyor of the Navy Willis was educated at Haileybury and Pembroke College, Cambridge, where he took a Bachelor of Arts (BA) in 1894, Cambridge Master of Arts (MA Cantab) in 1899, and Doctor of Divinity (DD) in 1912. He was ordained in 1895  and began his  career with a curacy in Great Yarmouth. Then he began a long period of service as a CMS missionary in Africa eventually becoming Archdeacon of Kavirondo before his appointment to the episcopate in 1912. In 1934 he returned to England to be Assistant Bishop of Leicester. He died on 12 November 1954.

References

External links

1872 births
1954 deaths
People educated at Haileybury and Imperial Service College
Alumni of Pembroke College, Cambridge
English Anglican missionaries
Anglican archdeacons in Africa
Anglican bishops of Uganda
Commanders of the Order of the British Empire
20th-century Anglican bishops in Uganda
Anglican missionaries in Uganda
Assistant bishops of Leicester